Pop Ambient 2014 is the 14th compilation album for ambient music. It was released in February 2014 under Kompakt Records.

Track list

References

2014 compilation albums
Kompakt compilation albums